Hochspeyer is a former Verbandsgemeinde ("collective municipality") in the district of Kaiserslautern, Rhineland-Palatinate, Germany. The seat of the Verbandsgemeinde was in Hochspeyer. On 1 July 2014 it merged into the Verbandsgemeinde Enkenbach-Alsenborn.

The Verbandsgemeinde Hochspeyer consisted of the following Ortsgemeinden ("local municipalities"):

 Fischbach
 Frankenstein
 Hochspeyer
 Waldleiningen

Former Verbandsgemeinden in Rhineland-Palatinate
Palatinate Forest